Nikita Andreyevich Gusev (born 8 July 1992), nicknamed "Goose", is a Russian professional ice hockey forward currently playing under contract for SKA Saint Petersburg of the Kontinental Hockey League (KHL).

He became known as one of the best players in the KHL – winning the KHL's Golden Stick (MVP) award in 2017–18, earning the most assists in a KHL season twice, and finished the 2018–19 season with 81 points (17 goals and 65 assists). His 81 points is the second-highest season total in the history of the KHL, behind Sergei Mozyakin's record of 85 points. Gusev won the KHL's Gagarin Cup championship in 2017 with SKA Saint Petersburg.

Internationally, he has represented Russia on numerous occasions, winning a gold medal at the 2018 Winter Olympics and a silver medal at the 2022 Winter Olympics.

Playing career

Professional

SKA Saint Petersburg
On 14 July 2017, Gusev signed a two-year contract extension with Kontinental Hockey League (KHL) powerhouse club SKA Saint Petersburg.

In the 2018–19 season, his last season under contract with SKA, Gusev posted a career and league-high 82 points, leading the KHL with 65 assists. He continued his offensive dominance in the post-season, contributing 19 points in 18 games before suffering a conference final defeat for the second consecutive season to CSKA Moscow. Through nine seasons in the KHL, Gusev is 10th all-time with 332 points in 391 games.

New Jersey Devils
On 21 June 2017, with the selection of Jason Garrison by the Vegas Golden Knights in the 2017 NHL Expansion Draft, the Knights received from the Tampa Bay Lightning the rights to Gusev, along with a second-round pick in the 2017 NHL Entry Draft and a fourth-round pick in the 2018 NHL Entry Draft as compensation for the Golden Knights agreeing to select Garrison.

On 14 April 2019, Gusev signed a one-year, entry-level contract with the Vegas Golden Knights, instantly joining the club amid their first-round playoff series against the San Jose Sharks, remaining on the Golden Knights extended squad without playing for the club.

On 29 July 2019, Gusev as a restricted free agent, was traded by the Golden Knights to the New Jersey Devils in exchange for a third-round pick in 2020 and a second-round pick in the 2021 NHL Entry Draft. He immediately agreed to terms with the Devils on a two-year, $9 million contract with an average annual value of $4,500,000. In the following 2019–20 season, Gusev made an immediate offensive impact with the rebuilding Devils, leading the club with 31 assists and placing second in points with 44 through 66 games before the remainder of the regular season was cancelled due to the COVID-19 pandemic.

With the Devils missing the postseason, Gusev returned to action in the delayed 2020–21 season and struggled to replicate the previous season's campaign offensively, posting just two goals and five points through 20 games. On 9 April 2021, the Devils placed Gusev on unconditional waivers in order to mutually terminate the remainder of his contract.

Florida Panthers
On 11 April 2021, Gusev signed as a free agent to a one-year, $1 million contract with the Florida Panthers.

Return to SKA
As a free agent over the summer and approaching the  season, Gusev opted to continue his career in the NHL, signing a Professional Tryout contract in accepting an invitation to attend the Toronto Maple Leafs training camp on September 18, 2021. Gusev was later released from his tryout on October 5, 2021. with no other NHL teams expressing an interest he opted to return to the KHL, with his former team SKA Saint Petersburg.

International play

 

Gusev has played for Russia at the World Junior Championships and World Championships. He was a member of the Olympic Athletes from Russia team at the 2018 Winter Olympics.

On 23 January 2022, Gusev was named to the roster to represent Russian Olympic Committee athletes at the 2022 Winter Olympics.

Career statistics

Regular season and playoffs

International

Awards and honors

References

External links
 

1992 births
Amur Khabarovsk players
HC CSKA Moscow players
Florida Panthers players
HC Yugra players
Ice hockey people from Moscow
Ice hockey players at the 2018 Winter Olympics
Ice hockey players at the 2022 Winter Olympics
Krasnaya Armiya (MHL) players
Living people
Medalists at the 2018 Winter Olympics
Medalists at the 2022 Winter Olympics
New Jersey Devils players
Olympic gold medalists for Olympic Athletes from Russia
Olympic silver medalists for the Russian Olympic Committee athletes
Olympic ice hockey players of Russia
Olympic medalists in ice hockey
Russian ice hockey forwards
SKA Saint Petersburg players
Tampa Bay Lightning draft picks